Mick Hayes (1921–2003) was an Irish sportsman.  He played hurling with his local club Butlerstown and was a member of the Waterford senior inter-county team in the 1940s and 1950s. Hayes is regarded as one of Waterford's greatest-ever players.

References

1921 births
2003 deaths
Butlerstown hurlers
Waterford inter-county hurlers
Munster inter-provincial hurlers
All-Ireland Senior Hurling Championship winners